As Is is the third British studio album by Manfred Mann, released in the United Kingdom on 21 October 1966 through Fontana Records. It was their fourth overall (including a "greatest hits" package) but their first to feature new members Mike d'Abo and Klaus Voormann.

Overview
The twelve tracks on the record include the line-up's first single release, a cut-down version of Bob Dylan's "Just Like a Woman" that reached the UK top ten, and a short cool jazz version of "Autumn Leaves", reminiscent of the Modern Jazz Quartet with Mike Hugg's vibraphone and double bass from the group's former bassist Dave Richmond, sounding like an out-take from the group's instrumental releases: these two make weight for a fairly short collection of group compositions. As d'Abo's presence somehow sparked Mike Hugg into producing baroque pop miniatures, both contribute three songs: d'Abo's "Box Office Draw" and "Trouble and Tea" are well-crafted pop, while "As Long as I Have Lovin'" is a generic soul ballad. Hugg's "Morning After the Party", also released as a "B" side and on the compilation album What a Mann, recalls the rowdy rhythm and blues of the group's past, while two of his three collaborations with Mann suggest something of the direction they would later take with Manfred Mann Chapter Three. Guitarist Tom McGuinness provides a range of textures, including his trademark National Steel Guitar and contributes sleeve notes and a gentle folk-ballad. The group continued to exploit studio multitracking: keyboardist Mann layering Mellotrons, bassist Voormann taking over from Mike Vickers on flutes.

Recording sessions 
All of the songs were recorded 30 June – 22 August 1966, at Philips Studio in Stanhope House, London, England, together with producer Shel Talmy:

 "Trouble and Tea", "Just Like a Woman" – 30 June 1966
 "Box Office Draw", "Dealer, Dealer", "Superstititous Guy" – 20 July 1966
 "Box Office Draw" – 12 August 1966
 "A Now and Then Thing", "Each Other's Company", "Morning After the Party", "Another Kind of Music", "As Long as I Have Lovin'", "Autumn Leaves", "You're My Girl" – 22 August 1966

Track listing

Personnel

Musicians
 Manfred Mann – keyboards
 Michael D'Abo – vocals; piano on "As Long As I Have Been Lovin'"
 Tom McGuinness – guitar
 Klaus Voormann – bass guitar, recorder, flute; guitar on "Another Kind of Music"
 Dave Richmond – double bass on "Autumn Leaves"
 Mike Hugg – drums, vibraphone

Technical
 Shel Talmy – producer
 Klaus Voormann – cover design
 Tom McGuinness – liner notes

References

1966 albums
Manfred Mann albums
Fontana Records albums
Albums produced by Shel Talmy
Albums with cover art by Klaus Voormann